This is a complete list of tributary streams of the Potomac River in the Eastern United States, listed in order from source to mouth.
North Branch Potomac River (Maryland/West Virginia)
South Branch Potomac River (Virginia/West Virginia)
Town Creek (Maryland/Pennsylvania)
Big Run (Maryland)
Little Cacapon River (West Virginia)
Purslane Run (Maryland)
Steer Run (West Virginia)
Fifteenmile Creek (Maryland/Pennsylvania)
Sideling Hill Creek (Maryland/Pennsylvania)
Willett Run (West Virginia)
Cacapon River (West Virginia)
Sir Johns Run (West Virginia)
Warm Spring Run (West Virginia)
Tonoloway Creek (Maryland/Pennsylvania)
Stoney Run (West Virginia)
Ditch Run (West Virginia)
Sleepy Creek (West Virginia)
Licking Creek (Maryland/Pennsylvania)
Big Run (West Virginia)
Cherry Run (West Virginia)
Back Creek (Virginia/West Virginia)
Green Spring Run (Maryland)
Harlan Run (West Virginia)
Camp Spring Run (Maryland)
Little Conococheague Creek (Maryland/Pennsylvania)
Conococheague Creek (Maryland/Pennsylvania)
Magruder Run (West Virginia)
Opequon Creek (Virginia/West Virginia)
Downey Branch (Maryland)
Marsh Run (Maryland)
Town Run (West Virginia)
Rattlesnake Run (West Virginia)
Antietam Creek (Maryland/Pennsylvania)
Elks Run (West Virginia)
Shenandoah River (Virginia/West Virginia)
Piney Run (Virginia)
Israel Creek (Maryland)
Dutchman Creek (Virginia)
Quarter Branch (Virginia)
Little Catoctin Creek (Maryland)
Catoctin Creek (Maryland)
Catoctin Creek (Virginia)
Tuscarora Creek (Maryland)
Monocacy River (Maryland/Pennsylvania)
Little Monocacy River (Maryland)
Limestone Branch (Virginia)
Broad Run (Maryland)
Goose Creek (Virginia)
Broad Run (Virginia)
Horsepen Branch (Maryland)
Sugarland Run (Virginia)
Seneca Creek (Maryland)
Old Sugarland Run (Virginia)
Muddy Branch (Maryland)
Nichols Run (Virginia)
Watts Branch (Maryland)
Limekiln Branch (Maryland)
Carroll Branch (Maryland)
Pond Run (Virginia)
Clarks Branch (Virginia)
Mine Run Branch (Virginia)
Difficult Run (Virginia)
Bullneck Run (Virginia)
Rock Run (Maryland)
Scott Run (Virginia)
Dead Run (Virginia)
Turkey Run (Virginia)
Cabin John Creek (Maryland)
Wisteria Run [unofficial name] (Virginia)
Minnehaha Branch (Maryland)
Little Falls Branch (Maryland)
Pimmit Run (Virginia)
Gulf Branch (Virginia)
Donaldson Run (Virginia)
Windy Run (Virginia)
Spout Run (Virginia)
Maddox Branch (District of Columbia)
Foundry Branch (District of Columbia)
Rock Creek (District of Columbia/Maryland)
Rocky Run (Virginia) (paved over)
Tiber Creek (District of Columbia) (paved over)
Roaches Run (Virginia)
Washington Channel (District of Columbia)
Anacostia River (District of Columbia/Maryland)
Four Mile Run (Virginia)
Oxon Creek (District of Columbia/Maryland)
Hunting Creek (Virginia)
Broad Creek (Maryland)
Henson Creek (Maryland)
Swan Creek (Maryland)
Piscataway Creek (Maryland)
Little Hunting Creek (Virginia)
Dogue Creek (Virginia)
Accotink Creek (Virginia)
Pohick Creek (Virginia)
Pomonkey Creek (Maryland)
Occoquan River (Virginia)
Neabsco Creek (Virginia)
Powells Creek (Virginia)
Mattawoman Creek (Maryland)
Chicamuxen Creek (Maryland)
Quantico Creek (Virginia)
Little Creek (Virginia)
Chopawamsic Creek (Virginia)
Tank Creek (Virginia)
Aquia Creek (Virginia)
Potomac Creek (Virginia)
Nanjemoy Creek (Maryland)
Port Tobacco River (Maryland)
Popes Creek (Maryland)
Gambo Creek (Virginia)
Piccowaxen Creek (Maryland)
Upper Machodoc Creek (Virginia)
Cuckold Creek (Maryland)
Wicomico River (Maryland)
Monroe Creek (Virginia)
Mattox Creek (Virginia)
Popes Creek (Virginia)
Nomini Creek (Virginia) 
Jackson Creek (Virginia)
Bonum Creek (Virginia)
St. Marys River (Maryland)
Yeocomico River (Virginia)
Garners Creek (Virginia)
Coan River (Virginia)
Cod Creek (Virginia)
Presley Creek (Virginia)
Hull Creek (Virginia)
Cubitt Creek (Virginia)
Hack Creek (Virginia)

References 

 
Potomac